Comasina is a station on Line 3 of the Milan Metro which opened on March 26, 2011, twenty-one years after the opening of the original trunk of the line. Since its opening, it is the northern terminus of the line and one of the four stations on Line 3 opened in 2011, part of the section from Dergano to Comasina.

This station is located in the Comasina district, and it allows interchange with several lines serving the northern part of the Province of Milan.

The station is underground and built on a single tunnel with two tracks.

References

Line 3 (Milan Metro) stations
Railway stations opened in 2011
2011 establishments in Italy
Railway stations in Italy opened in the 21st century